Scutellum may refer to:

Scutellum (insect anatomy), a term used in the anatomy of arthropods
Scutellum (botany), a term used in the morphology of grasses
Scutellum (trilobite), a genus of trilobites

See also
 Scutella (genus), a prehistoric echinoid genus